Panangala West Grama Niladhari Division is a Grama Niladhari Division of the Thawalama Divisional Secretariat of Galle District of Southern Province, Sri Lanka. It has Grama Niladhari Division Code 225A.

Panangala West is a surrounded by the Marakanda, Eppala, Malhathawa, Panangala North and Panangala East Grama Niladhari Divisions.

Demographics

Ethnicity 
The Panangala West Grama Niladhari Division has a Sinhalese majority (99.5%). In comparison, the Thawalama Divisional Secretariat (which contains the Panangala West Grama Niladhari Division) has a Sinhalese majority (93.7%)

Religion 
The Panangala West Grama Niladhari Division has a Buddhist majority (99.1%). In comparison, the Thawalama Divisional Secretariat (which contains the Panangala West Grama Niladhari Division) has a Buddhist majority (93.0%)

References 

Grama Niladhari Divisions of Thawalama Divisional Secretariat